Kine or KINE may refer to:

Radio and TV stations 
 KINE-FM, a radio station (105.1 FM) licensed to Honolulu, Hawaii, United States
 KINE (AM), a radio station (1330 AM) licensed to Kingsville, Texas, United States
 KINE-LP, a defunct low-power television station (channel 44) formerly licensed to Robstown, Texas

People with the name 
 Kine Beate Bjørnås (born 1980), Norwegian cross-country skier
 Kine Ludvigsen (born 1980), Norwegian singer

Other uses 
 Da kine, a Hawaiian Pidgin placeholder word
 An archaic plural for cow
 A pestle used with the Japanese usu
 A helper character from the Kirby video game series
 Kine, the first book of The Kine Saga trilogy, later republished as Marshworld
 Abbreviation of Kinescope, the recording of a television program by filming the picture from a video monitor

See also
 
 Kyne